The SCA SFR-10 was a tourism aircraft built by Société Commercial Aéronautique (SCA) in France, in the early 1930s.

Design
The SFR-10 featured a high-wing monoplane layout of all-wood construction.

Specifications

References

1930s French aircraft